North Weald Bassett or simply North Weald is a village and civil parish in the Epping Forest district of Essex, England. The village is within the North Weald Ridges and Valleys landscape area.

A market is held every Saturday and Bank Holiday Monday at North Weald Airfield. The market used to be the largest open air market in the country but reduced its size over the years.

Geography
The parish abuts the outskirts of the towns of Harlow to the north and Epping to the south-west, and is split between these post towns for postal addresses. The parish includes the village of North Weald and the hamlets of Foster Street, Thornwood, Thornwood Common, Tyler's Green, and Hastingwood.

It is rural, with large sections of parish land at the south-west used by North Weald Golf Course, and North Weald Airfield and (ICAO: EGSX), an operational general aviation aerodrome which was an important fighter station during the Battle of Britain, when it was known as the RAF Station RAF North Weald.

Latton Priory was a small priory of Augustinian Canons Regular, the remains of which are a Grade II* listed building.  Paris Hall is a 16th-century Grade II* listed house.

History 
In 1086 North Weald was one of the most thickly wooded places in Essex. Peter de Valognes' manor in North Weald was said to contain woodland sufficient for 1,500 swine, showing how wooded the area was.

The 'wood of Henry of Essex' in North Weald was mentioned in 1248.  In 1260 Philip Basset, Henry's successor as lord of the manor, complained that many robberies were being done in this wood near the road between Ongar and Waltham, and he secured the king's permission to assart (turn forestry into arable land) 6 acres of the wood.

Norden's Map of Essex, 1594, does not show North Weald as a densely wooded parish. In 1777 there was apparently no woodland there apart from Weald Hall Coppice.  This is specially interesting in view of the survival of large woods in neighbouring parishes. Weald Hall Coppice still survives, and there is also a small wood at Canes farm. North Weald formed 1,739 acres of the Ongar Hundred.

The ancient manor houses were Weald Hall, near the centre of the parish, Canes, Marshalls and Paris Hall at Hastingwood. In addition to the four manor houses there were probably substantial medieval dwellings at Tylers Green, Bowlers Green, Bridge Farm (near Weald Bridge), and possibly one or two other places. The parish church, St Andrew's, which dates from the 14th century, is ½ mile east of Weald Hall.

Apart from the church the oldest existing building in the parish is probably Tylers. This is a timber-framed and plastered house consisting of a central block with a gabled cross-wing at each end. It may date from the 16th century but there is some evidence that the central block was an earlier open hall with a screens passage at its south-west end. The 'King's Head' at Weald Gullet is a timber-framed building probably of the same period. It was restored about 1927. Two ancient timber-framed cottages which formerly stood on the north side of the main road near the end of Church Lane were destroyed in a German air raid in 1941.

Until the 17th century the Epping-Chelmsford road was probably the most important in the parish. In 1786 a petition was presented to the Epping Highway Trust by the people of North Weald asking that the road should be taken over by the trust. An Act of Parliament for this purpose was passed in the following year. A toll-gate was erected at the junction of the main road and Woodside. The gate-keeper lived at first in a rented cottage but a toll-house was built about 1818. This still survives: a single-story building of brick, now plastered, with a tiled roof.

In 1801 North Weald, with 620 inhabitants, was one of the more densely populated parishes of the area.  In the 19th century the population followed the trend normal in rural Essex until about 1861: there was an increase to 886 in 1831 and a subsequent slight decrease. But between 1861 and 1901, when the agricultural depression was depopulating most villages, the population of North Weald rose from 842 to 1,135. This was clearly due to the coming of the railway in 1865. New places of worship in the 19th century were the Congregational chapel in Weald Bridge Road, built about 1830 but closed about 1874, the Chapel of Ease at Hastingwood (1864), the Iron Mission Church at Thornwood (1888), and the Wesleyan churches at Thornwood (1883) and Weald Gullet (1888).  The original school was relinquished in favour of a larger building and the new school was extended in about 1842 and again in 1871. 

In 1865 coach travel in this area was superseded by the opening of the railway through Epping to Ongar, with a station at North Weald. This brought London within easy reach. This line was electrified in 1957 but closed to regular passenger traffic in 1994. Beyond Ongar public transport was poor until the introduction of motor buses. There are now infrequent bus services to Epping, Ongar, Brentwood. 

North Weald was late in getting its own post-office, probably because it was served directly from Epping. In 1883 a day mail was established at North Weald. A telegraph office was set up in 1886.  The telephone service was introduced in 1920.

The population rose very little during the first 20 years of the 20th century, and was only 1,239 in 1921 with the Post Office Radio Station established at Weald Gullet in 1921. There was an increase to 1,642 in 1931 and then a burst of building lasting until the Second World War.  A few council houses were built before 1939. In the 1940s, the North Weald Bassett Parish was formed and North Weald was removed from the Ongar Hundred and placed, along with Thornwood, Hastingwood and various other small villages in the parish.

Since 1945 three large housing estates have been built. In 1953 the estimated population of North Weald was 3,200-an increase of almost 100 per cent. on 1931. The iron mission church at Thornwood was replaced in 1923 by a brick church and in 1931 the Wesleyan church at Weald Gullet was rebuilt. In 1939, however, the Wesleyan church at Thornwood was closed owing to lack of support. A village hall was built in 1928, on the south side of the village. In 1967, the village hall was rebuilt.

Governance and demography
The parish was part of Ongar Rural District from 1894 to 1955 and Epping and Ongar Rural District from 1955 to 1974. The parish is run by a parish council, with its offices in the village of North Weald.

As at the 2001 census the population was 6,039 and 51.5% female, with an average age of 39. There are 2,387 households, with an average household size of 2.45.

North Weald is represented at Westminster by Alex Burghart, MP for Brentwood and Ongar. It is a strongly Conservative area with the Conservatives winning 60% of the vote in 2015's local elections.

Confusion may arise between Brentwood and Ongar constituency and Epping Forest constituency.

North Weald is represented on Essex County Council by the Conservative county councillor for North Weald and Nazeing, having won the 2017 election with 78.5% of the vote, followed by Labour with 12.7%.

North Weald Bassett parish is governed by a parish council, and includes North Weald, Thornwood, Hastingwood, Tyler's Green and Foster Street. Fifteen unelected councillors are part of the council, which manages such things as local cemeteries, green space, recreational grounds, and allotments. Parish council composition in June 2018: 

List of parish chairman for the North Weald Bassett parish:

Geography 
The village is in the southwest highest part of the North Weald Bassett parish which rises to 300 ft.

There are significant patches of sensitive historic landscape at the north-eastern and western edges of the village, which encompass patches of surviving pre-18th-century and 18th- 19th-century fields and a large area of ancient landscape to the south of the village. Also to the west and east of North Weald Airfield, sensitive areas of historic landscape comprise surviving pre 18th century and 18th- 19th-century fields. Much was previously used for arable farming.

Five areas with urban green-space character provide accessible areas for sport and recreation.

Demography 
 As of 2001 census the population was 4,461 and 51.5% female, with an average age of 39. 

As of 2011 there are 1,867 households with an average household size of 2.45. Population density (people per hectare) stands at 6.80.

In 2011, 98% of citizens were white-British, 1% were mixed and 1% Asian. The majority of citizens identify as Christian. The average life expectancy in North Weald is 80–82 years.

In terms of housing, over 28% of residents own their home, with a further 47% still owing a mortgage. 12% of residents live in council houses. Residents of North Weald also vary in terms of their trade. In 2011, the majority of North Weald residents worked in retail (16%). 13% worked in real estate and 12% in manufacturing. Unemployment in North Weald is low (2.0% in 2011).

The demographic are men between 40 and 44 who make up 9% of the total population. Women make up a similar number.

There are two care homes in North Weald, Leonard Davis House and Cunningham House to accommodate for the large proportion of residents who are over 60.

Landmarks

 The Redoubt / Mobilisation Centre at North Weald was built in about 1880. Part of the London Defence Positions scheme, it was one of several built to provide ammunition to protect London if war ever broke out.
 The Allan Williams Turret is one of two built to protect a nearby radio station.  The home guard were stationed here during the war to guard against sabotage and to assist in filling in bomb craters as the Luftwaffe used to try to knock out the transmitters. RAF North Weald is nearby and the control tower is viewable from the hill. Planes had to avoid hitting the masts as well. The place went through a series of changes of antenna type and redevelopments throughout the 1950s/60s and 1970s.  Eventually it was shutdown in the mid-1990s. Around 1997 there was fire caused by vandals, and C block was razed to the ground.  Parts of some of the other blocks still exist including building E which is now used for comms to a Mobile Phone mast. The biggest attraction now is the antenna points and the redoubt over 100 years old.

 There is a Saturday open-air market based on the airfield which draws visitors from Essex and North London. It claims to be one of the largest open air markets in the UK. A bus service, subsidised by the company that owns the market, operates between the market and Harlow. The Market regularly attracts crowds estimated to be in excess of 10,000 on a weekly basis.
 The North Weald Airfield Museum is the people who worked at RAF North Weald in the First and Second World Wars, including both service personnel and civilians. Exhibits include photographs, personal memories, and artifacts about the airfield's history, including its role in the Battle of Britain, the American and Norwegian squadrons stationed there in the First World War, and the Royal Air Force squadrons stationed there over the years. The museum, with military vehicles and historic aircraft, is in the former RAF North Weald Station Office.
 The RAF North Weald Memorial is dedicated to all who served at North Weald. Located near the airfield's main gate and next to the museum. The memorial includes an obelisk erected in 1952 by the people of Norway in commemoration of the Norwegian airmen stationed at the airfield in World War II.

 The village hall was founded in 1928 with land donated by the old Marconi company. This is where North Weald residents stage outdoor events, such as 'Dog Day'. The main hall was rebuilt in 1967, with only the rear stage area remaining from the old hall. A bar lounge was added in 1987. The hall holds events including spiritualist healing clinics, bagpipe practice, dancing and jazz. It also acts as the village polling station for all elections and referendums.
 Latton Priory was a small priory of Augustinian Canons Regular, rebuilt in the 14th century using flint rubble dressed with reused Roman brick, the remains of which are a Grade II listed building. The monument includes the site of the Augustinian priory of St John the Baptist, now Latton Priory Farm, and is located to the south of Harlow, approximately 1 km to the south west of junction 7 on the M11.
 The King's Head is one of the oldest pubs in the county of Essex, with parts of the structure dating back nearly 450 years. The main building is of half wood construction which dates back to the 17th century, and was originally built using old ships' timbers.

 North Weald station on the Epping Ongar heritage line, once in a state of disrepair, has been restored to 1940s LNER condition, complete with period lamps, footbridge and signage. The original 1888 signal box and lever frame, located on Platform 1, has also been attended to and restored. An “Anglia Buffet” coach restaurant and well-stocked gift shop help attract hundreds of thousands of tourists a year. Vintage buses travel out to Epping, Ongar or Shenfield. North Weald sends trains from its 3 platforms to Ongar or to Epping Forest, to a few meters from Epping Underground station platforms.
 North Weald is surrounded by numerous commons and fields such as Weald Common. These sloping fields flow down from the aerial mast and bowls club and is home to deer, rare birds and other animals

Transport

The M11 motorway cuts through the middle of the parish and has a junction with the A414 road. The southern boundary runs parallel to the heritage Epping Ongar Railway and makes a small deviation to include the whole of North Weald railway station. The nearest regularly served stations are outside the parish, with Harlow Town railway station  to the north-west and Epping tube station  to the south-west of the extreme edge of the parish border.

Bus
Bus services are provided by Arriva Shires & Essex, and TrustyBus.

Local bus routes 420, 420A, 396, 501 (Sundays only), SB06 and Epping Ongar Railway Vintage Route 339 serve the station and North Weald village.

Train

The nearest London Underground service to the village is Epping which is served by the Central line. The closest National Rail service is from Harlow Town, which is served by the West Anglia Main Line and is operated by Abellio Greater Anglia.

The Epping to Ongar branch was not heavily used and became increasingly unprofitable. The service was further undermined when the Greater London Council removed the running subsidy for the line because it was not within the boundary of Greater London, and no comparable subsidy was forthcoming from the local government agencies in Essex, which meant that fare levels were much higher than on the rest of the Underground network. Initially, the Sunday service was dropped, and then the Saturday service. Subsequently, the service was restricted to a rush hour service only of seven trains in each direction per day (three in the morning and four in the evening). London Transport (later London Underground Ltd) had made repeated representations to the government to close the line, but each was refused as there was no alternative mode of transport between Epping and Ongar.

A final request was made in 1994 with a proviso that the line was to be sold to a private organisation which would continue to run the services. With the promise of continued services, the government finally agreed to London Underground closing the line. The line, including North Weald station, was closed on 30 September 1994. 

It was not until 2004 that a volunteer force restored a partial service as a heritage railway, although this was closed later. After officially opening in 2012 as a heritage service Because London Underground would not provide platform space at Epping, North Weald is currently the westernmost terminus of the line, though a shuttle runs further west as far as Coopersale, though there are no station facilities there. It is intended to run to a separate station facility near Epping station in the future.

The station itself has been extensively restored, with all the rooms being restored to their original uses, restoring the station to British Rail colours. The original GER signalbox dating from 1888 is being restored, complete with its original lever frame, as part of the works to signal the passing loop which has been reinstated through the station. The westbound platform has been restored, with a new accessible ramp installed and an original GER latticework footbridge (formerly from Woodford) erected.

The branch once again runs locomotive-hauled trains between Ongar and North Weald, with a diesel shuttle towards Coopersale and connecting heritage buses to Epping.

Road 
A number of major arterial roads (B181 to Epping and A414 to London, Newmarket and, in the opposite direction, to Chelmsford) run nearby. The main road from London to Newmarket and Norwich runs through the west and that from Epping to Chelmsford through the south of the parish. A large R.A.F. station and wireless masts are prominent features of the landscape and there has recently been much domestic building. But some parts of North Weald are still rural and accessible through rural lanes.

Air 

An iconic WW2 airfield remains popular with private flyers, North Weald Airfield owned by Epping Forest District Council. It is the home of North Weald Airfield Museum. Although unlicensed it is home to many private aircraft and historic types, and is host to a wide range of events throughout the year, including the Air-Britain Classic Fly-in and smaller airshows. On occasions North Weald has 300 to 500 movements a day.

North Weald is home to several vintage and veteran aircraft such as the Spitfire, Mustang, Kittyhawk, Dakota, Skyraider, Seafire and Harvard, and also home to early ex-military jets such as the Hunter, Venom, Vampire, Gnat, Jet Provost, along with general aviation types such as the SportCruiser, Cessna 172, Piper PA28, Aero AT3 and the Cirrus SR22. Resident organizations include Area 51, Hangar 11 Collection, Aces High, and Kennet Aviation.

An original 1927 hangar remains, as does the former Officers Mess, a Grade 2 listed building. Some former married quarters dating from the early 1970s (and now in private ownership) can be seen in Lancaster and York Roads. A Hawker Hurricane Mk1 replica has been erected near the main gate and can be viewed on market days. The airfield was granted listed status in 2005.

Sport
Bantham and Ongar Bowls Club plays behind the Talbot pub, and North Weald Wireless Station Bowls Club plays next to the old BT Telecom site.

North Weald Cricket Club was formed in 1983 and started playing in 1984. They play home matches at the Memorial Playing Field. The Saturday team play in the Herts and Essex Cricket League division 3. The club also play friendlies on Sundays.

There are two football teams: Weald Bassett which is a junior side, and North Weald FC which plays in the Bishop's Stortford and District Football League. They play at Stonards Hill in Epping.

Blakes 18-hole golf course is at North Weald North Weald also has a par 3 golf course on High road opposite the Airfield.

Education 
The village school is St Andrew's Christian Primary school. This school is a two-form primary school. There are two nurseries and  pre-schools. The county council also runs a small library which doubles up as a meeting room for the parish council.

Notable people 
Richard Biscoe (d. 1748), a nonconformist minister who later conformed and became chaplain to George II and Boyle lecturer 1736–38, was Vicar of North Weald from 1738 to 1748.

Media
In the 1990s, the Aces High hangar was used as the home for Channel 4's TV game show The Crystal Maze, which had moved from Shepperton Studios because of lack of space.

A sketch for BBC television's The Armstrong & Miller Show was filmed at the railway station. The sketch depicted Miller's character attempting to commit suicide from the old station bridge. Armstrong's character, a railway guard, comes and tells Miller's character that trains aren't running but a replacement bus service is in operation. The camera cuts to the station car park with Miller's character just under some bus wheels; the bus is then ordered to drive forward with a bump being seen.

Channel Four's television show Chewing Gum filmed part of their second series (broadcast 2017) down Vicarage Lane.

Boy George's team filmed on the railway for his 2013 music video "Coming Home". The shoot included both afternoon and evening filming of a train composed of stock of various arrangements from the chosen vintage period, giving backdrops for a wide range of scenes.

Sacha Baron Cohen's film Grimsby (2016) was also filmed at North Weald station and around the area.

In 2017, the BBC filmed an advert at North Weald station to advertise their online glossary about their coverage of Brexit.

References

External links
 North Weald Bassett Parish Council
 Epping Forest District Council
 Essex County Council

 
Villages in Essex
Civil parishes in Essex
Epping Forest District